Pacific Transit System is a public transit operator in Pacific County, Washington. It operates 5 routes in the county, connecting to adjacent systems in Aberdeen and Astoria, Oregon.

History

A public transportation benefit area for Pacific County was created on August 8, 1979. A 0.3 percent sales tax was approved by voters in November 1979, and bus service began on January 2, 1980 through contracts with Grays Harbor Transit and Washington Coast Lines.

Fares

Routes 14, 24, or 50: $0.50
Routes 20, 32 and Dial-a-Ride: $0.35

Routes

Fleet

Current Bus Fleet

References

External links

Bus transportation in Washington (state)
Transit agencies in Washington (state)
Transportation in Pacific County, Washington